Kohren-Sahlis is a town and a former municipality in the Leipzig district, in Saxony, Germany. Since January 2018, it is part of the town Frohburg. It is situated 14 km southeast of Borna, and 31 km northwest of Chemnitz.

History 
The first documented mention of Kohren-Sahlis was in 974.

Nazi Era
From  1 November 1942 to 14 April 1945 the children's home "Sonnenwiese" (Sunny Meadow), which was operated by the SS Lebensborn organization, was located in Kohren-Salis. Primarily children abducted from Norway were placed here before they were passed on for adoption to families loyal to the Nazi system .

Religion 

Kohren-Sahlis is situated in a traditional Lutheran area. The Saint Gangulphus Church in Kohren-Sahlis, the Christ Church in Rüdigsdorf, the Village Churches in Altmörbitz and Gnandstein as well as the Chapel of Gnandstein Castle all belong to the Kohren Region Parish of the Evangelical-Lutheran Church of Saxony.

The few Catholics in Kohren-Sahlis belong to St. Joseph's Parish of Borna, Bishopric of Dresden-Meissen.

Culture and Attractions

Museums 
 Pottery museum
 Hoffmann’sche Collection Museum
 Gnandstein Castle Museum

Monuments and Buildings 
 Ceramic fountain by Kurt Feuerriegel of (Frohburg), Market Square
 Ruins of Kohren Castle
 St. Gangolphus's Church in Kohren with rectory
 Gnandstein Castle

References 

Leipzig (district)
Former municipalities in Saxony